Sahlbergella is a genus of African bugs in the family Miridae and tribe Dicyphini (subtribe Odoniellina).

Species are mostly distributed in Africa, where S. singularis is a major insect pest of cacao: causing damage similar to Distantiella in tropical Africa and Helopeltis spp. in SE Asia.

Species
The Global Biodiversity Information Facility lists:<ref name = GBIF>[https://www.gbif.org/species/4777601 Global Biodiversity Information Facility: Sahlbergella Haglund, 1895 (retrieved 9 November 2021)]</ref>
 Sahlbergella ghesquierei Schouteden, 1935
 Sahlbergella lais Linnavuori, 1973
 Sahlbergella maynei Schouteden, 1935
 Sahlbergella singularis Haglund, 1895 - type species
 Sahlbergella soror Schouteden, 1935
 Sahlbergella tai'' Schmitz, 1987

References

External links
 

Miridae genera
Hemiptera of Africa